This is a list of notable Turkish exchange-traded funds, or ETFs.

 DJIST – Dow Jones Istanbul 20 is the first Exchange Traded Fund in Turkey. (tracks Dow Jones Turkey Titans 20 Index) 
 NFIST – Non-Financial Istanbul 20 is the first sector Exchange Traded Fund in Turkey. (tracks Non-Financial Istanbul 20 Index)
 SMIST – Turkish Smaller Companies Istanbul 25 is the first style Exchange Traded Fund in Turkey. (tracks Turkish Smaller Companies Istanbul 25 Index)
 GOLDIST / GLDTR / GOLD ETF – Istanbul GOLD ETF (GOLDIST) is the first Gold ETF in Turkey and is listed on the Istanbul Stock Exchange. GOLDIST aims to reflect the performance of Gold and can be traded in terms of gram equivalent shares. (tracks the international spot USD Ounce price of Gold)
 FBIST – FTSE Istanbul Bond ETF is the first fixed income ETF in both Turkey and Developing Europe. (tracks FTSE Turkish Lira Government Bond Index)

See also
List of exchange-traded funds

Turkish